Niilo Liakka (23 June 1864 – 26 January 1945) was a Finnish educationist and politician, born in Alatornio. He served as Minister of Education from 9 April 1921 to 2 June 1922 and from 14 November 1922 to 18 January 1924 and as Minister of Social Affairs from 31 May to 22 November 1924. He was a member of the Parliament of Finland from 1919 to 1922, representing the Agrarian League.

References

1864 births
1945 deaths
People from Tornio
People from Oulu Province (Grand Duchy of Finland)
Centre Party (Finland) politicians
Ministers of Education of Finland
Ministers of Social Affairs of Finland
Members of the Parliament of Finland (1919–22)
University of Helsinki alumni